The 1986–87 Kent Football League season was the 21st in the history of the Kent Football League, a football competition in England.

The league was won by Greenwich Borough but the club was not promoted to the Southern Football League.

League table

The league featured all the 18 clubs which competed in the previous season.

Slade Green Athletic changed their name to Slade Green.

League table

References

External links

1986-87
1986–87 in English football leagues